Canbury School is a small, independent day school in Kingston upon Thames, Greater London with a maximum of 75 pupils on roll.

History
Canbury School was founded by John Wyatt in 1982. He had previously taught in several large schools with high academic standards and had come to believe that such standards could be applied to children with a broader range of ability. A smaller school would allow children to be more involved in their progress and in the community and to be more motivated and happier.

In 1997, Wyatt retired and the school became an educational charity administered by a Board of Governors, thus assuming its long-term stability. Cedric Harben was appointed Headmaster. Further developments took place and, following a rigorous inspection, the school gained full accreditation from the Independent Schools Council and joined the Independent Schools Association.

The school building was once a domestic residence owned by Malcolm Campbell. His son Donald was born there in 1921.

Facilities
The school is on Kingston Hill at the corner of Warboys Approach. It has a new science laboratory and prep room, an art studio equipped with a pottery area and kiln, and access to local facilities for a wide range of sporting activities including athletics, cricket, netball, softball, swimming and watersports.

References

External links
Official website
Link to the school's most recent ISI inspection report

1982 establishments in England
Educational institutions established in 1982
Private co-educational schools in London
Private schools in the Royal Borough of Kingston upon Thames